Alejandra Zavala Vázquez (born 16 June 1984 in Guadalajara, Jalisco) is a Mexican female sport shooter. At the 2012 Summer Olympics, she competed in the Women's 10 metre air pistol.

References

External links
 

Mexican female sport shooters
Living people
Olympic shooters of Mexico
Shooters at the 2012 Summer Olympics
Shooters at the 2016 Summer Olympics
1984 births
Sportspeople from Guadalajara, Jalisco
Shooters at the 2015 Pan American Games
Pan American Games medalists in shooting
Pan American Games silver medalists for Mexico
Medalists at the 2015 Pan American Games
21st-century Mexican women